The Pick-Sloan Flood Control Act of 1944 (P.L. 78–534), enacted in the 2nd session of the 78th Congress, is U.S. legislation that authorized the construction of numerous dams and modifications to previously existing dams, as well as levees across the United States.  Among its various provisions, it established the Southeastern Power Administration and the Southwestern Power Administration, and led to the establishment of the Pick-Sloan Missouri Basin Program.

The Pick-Sloan legislation managed the Missouri River with six intents: hydropower, recreation, water supply, navigation, flood control and fish and wildlife. Over 50 dams and lakes have been built due to this legislation, not just on the mainly affected river but also on tributaries and other connected rivers. Nebraska, as an example, has seen more than eight new lakes created due to the damming of the Missouri and tributaries.  The Act also recognized the legitimate rights of states, through the Governor, to impact flood control projects.   See  33 US section 701-1 which  declared it to be the policy of the Congress 

to recognize the interests and rights of the States in determining the development of the watersheds within their borders and likewise their interests and rights in water utilization and control.

The Act was signed by President Franklin D. Roosevelt on December 22, 1944.  It was named for General Lewis A. Pick, head of the Army Corps of Engineers, and W. Glenn Sloan of the Interior Department's Bureau of Reclamation.

Effects
The Lakota, Dakota and Nakota tribes lost . The Three Affiliated Tribes, specifically, lost  in their Fort Berthold Reservation due to the building of the Garrison Dam. The project caused more than 1,500 Native Americans to relocate from the river bottoms of the Missouri river due to the flooding.

The project has successfully controlled flooding throughout the Missouri River basin, provided water for irrigation and municipalities, generated baseload power throughout the central US.

However, the Missouri River dumped millions of cubic feet of soil into the Mississippi River every year, which, deposited the silt into the gulf and formed a string of barrier islands. When the silt was eliminated, the island-building stopped. Biologists sounded the alarm in the 1970s. By the 1990s, the barrier islands were almost gone, and Louisiana was left unprotected from storm surges and oil spills.

See also
Flood Control Act
Flood Control Act of 1937
Missouri River Valley
Water Resources Development Act
Rivers and Harbors Act

External links
U.S. Fish & Wildlife Service: Printable copies of legislation  including this Act.

References

United States federal transportation legislation
1944 in the environment
1944 in law
78th United States Congress
United States federal legislation articles without infoboxes
1944